Bjelopolje is a village in Lika-Senj County, central Croatia. It is connected by the D1 highway.

Populated places in Lika-Senj County
Serb communities in Croatia